Paul Kocher may refer to:

 Paul Carl Kocher, cryptographer
 Paul H. Kocher, professor of English and author